The Potez 540 was a French multi-role aircraft of the 1930s. Designed and built by Potez, it served with the French Air Force as a reconnaissance bomber, also serving with the Spanish Republican Air Force during the Spanish Civil War. Although obsolete as a bomber, it remained in service in support roles and in France's overseas colonies at the start of World War II.

History
This two-engine aircraft was built by the French Potez company to fulfill a 1932 specification for a new reconnaissance bomber. Built as a private venture, this aircraft, designated the Potez 54, flew for the first time on 14 November 1933. Designed by Louis Coroller, it was intended as a four-seat aircraft capable of performing duties such as bomber, transport and long-range reconnaissance. The Potez 54 was a high-wing monoplane, of mixed wood and metal covering over a steel tube frame. The prototype had twin fins and rudders, and was powered by two 515 kW (690 hp) Hispano-Suiza 12Xbrs V-12 engines in streamlined nacelles, which were connected to the fuselage by stub wings. The main landing gear units retracted into the nacelles, and auxiliary bomb racks were mounted beneath the stub wings. There were manually operated turrets at the nose and dorsal positions, as well as a semi-retractable dustbin-style ventral turret. During development, the original tailplane was replaced by a single fin and rudder, and in this form, the type was re-designated the Potez 540 and delivered to the Armee de I'Air on 25 November 1934. A total of 192 Potez 540s were built.

Their first combat was in the Spanish Civil War, where they were employed by the Spanish loyalist side. A poor design that was already obsolete just two years after its introduction, when confronted by the higher performance German and Italian planes of the same period, the Potez 540 proved itself a failure in Spanish skies during the Civil War and was labelled as 'Flying Coffin' by Spanish Republican pilots. In the late 1930s, these aircraft were becoming obsolete so they were withdrawn from reconnaissance and bombing duties and were relegated to French transport units. They were also employed as paratrooper training and transport aircraft. By September 1939 and the beginning of World War II, they had been largely transferred to the French colonies in North Africa, where they continued to function in transport and paratrooper service. Their role in even these secondary assignments was problematic given their poor defensive armament and vulnerability to modern enemy fighters. Following the French capitulation to Germany in June 1940, those Potez 540s still flying served the Vichy French Air Force mainly in the French overseas colonies. Most of these machines were retired or destroyed by late 1943.

Variants
Potez 54
One prototype, later converted (with twin tails) into the Potez 540 No. 1.
Potez 540
Production aircraft with 1 each of  Hispano-Suiza 12Xirs and 12Xjrs, (left and right hand rotation), V-12 inline engines. 185 built. Used by France and Spain.
Potez 541
540 re-engined with   Gnome-Rhône 14Kdrs radial engines. One converted from a 540.
Potez 542
Derivative of 540 powered by   Lorraine 12Hfrs Pétrel V-12 engines. 74 built. Used by France and Spain.
Potez 543
Production derivative of Potez 541, powered by  Gnome-Rhône 14Kdrs radial engines. 10 built for Romania, only eight were delivered and four were diverted to Spain for use by Spanish Republicans.

Operators

Armée de l'Air
French Navy

Regia Aeronautica

Royal Romanian Air Force
 Spanish Republic
Spanish Republican Air Force

Specifications (Potez 540)

See also

References

Bibliography

External links

 Aviafrance - Potez 540

1930s French bomber aircraft
1930s French military reconnaissance aircraft
054
Aircraft first flown in 1933
Twin piston-engined tractor aircraft